Ozerne may refer to:

 Ozerne (Zhytomyr Oblast), an urban-type settlement in Zhytomyr Oblast of Ukraine
 Ozerne (air base), an air base in Ozerne, Zhytomyr Oblast, Ukraine
 Ozerna, Edmonton, Canada, a neighborhood